Faisal Javed Khan is a Pakistani politician who has been a Member of the Senate of Pakistan, since March 2018. He was also elected as Chairman Senate Standing Committee on Information and Broadcasting.  Senator Faisal Javed Khan is the most followed Senator in Pakistan on Twitter.

Political career
Faisal Javed Khan began his political career in 1996 with Pakistan Tehreek-e-Insaf (PTI). He has hosted more than 500 PTI political rallies across Pakistan and known as the "Voice of PTI".

As of February 2018, he was serving as a member of the core and central executive committees of the PTI and its central additional secretary information. Khan has also campaigned for PTI Chief Imran Khan in 1997, 2002, 2013 and 2018 general elections. Faisal Javed Khan spoke at the European Parliament as a part of Parliamentarians from European Union member states and 18 Asian countries in the two day Asia-Europe Parliamentary Partnership (ASEP) meetings that debated the environmental challenges faced by Asia and Europe. He also moderated Imran Khan's big rally at Capital One Arena in the downtown Washington, DC in 2019.

Faisal Javed Khan was elected to the Senate of Pakistan as a candidate of PTI on general seat from Khyber Pakhtunkhwa in 2018 Pakistani Senate election. He took oath as Senator on 12 March 2018.

Khan was injured during the attempted assassination of Imran Khan.

Professional career
Khan, as an Advertising and marketing specialist, have been associated with the field of Production, Advertising and Media for more than 17 years.

Khan has also been a radio broadcaster and producer for a decade from 2001 to 2011.

References

Living people
Pakistan Tehreek-e-Insaf politicians
Members of the Senate of Pakistan
People from Swabi District
1986 births
Pakistani politicians
Politicians from Khyber Pakhtunkhwa